The 1890 Rutgers Queensmen football team represented Rutgers University as an independent during the 1890 college football season. The Queensmen compiled a 5–5–1 record and outscored their opponents, 222 to 147. The team had no coach, and its captain for the second consecutive year was James Bishop, Jr.

Schedule

References

Rutgers
Rutgers Scarlet Knights football seasons
Rutgers Queensmen football